Monica Innes Asher  is a New Zealand paediatrician. She is professor of paediatrics at the University of Auckland.

Early life 
Asher studied at the Auckland Medical School (1968 to 1973). She also undertook postgraduate study in Paediatrics in Auckland, Whakatane, Ruatoki and at the Montreal Children’s Hospital for three years (where she also specialised in respiratory medicine).

Career 
Asher has been a committee member and health spokesperson for the Child Poverty Action Group for 20 years.

In 2016 she stepped down as Head of the University of Auckland's Department of Paediatrics: Child and Youth Health, after being in the role for more than 13 years.

In May 2018 she was appointed to the Government's Welfare Expert Advisory Group.

She is the chairperson of the Global Asthma Network Executive Group.

Honours and awards
 In the 2003 New Year Honours, Asher was appointed an Officer of the New Zealand Order of Merit, for services to paediatrics.
 In 2007, the Health Research Council awarded her the Liley Medal for her research leadership.
 In 2017, she was selected as one of the Royal Society of New Zealand's "150 women in 150 words".
 In 2018, she received the New Zealand Medical Association’s Chair’s Award for 2017. The award was in recognition of her work to raise awareness of poverty as a key cause for acute and chronic ill-health among children.

References

External links 
 University of Auckland profile

Living people
New Zealand paediatricians
New Zealand women academics
Academic staff of the University of Auckland
University of Auckland alumni
Paediatrics in New Zealand
New Zealand medical researchers
Year of birth missing (living people)